Mike McCurry may refer to:

Mike McCurry (press secretary) (born 1954), White House press secretary under President Bill Clinton
Mike McCurry (referee) (born 1964), Scottish football referee